Coccosteina is an extinct infraorder of placoderms, armored fish most diverse during the Devonian. However, the term is no longer in use, as modern cladistical methods have produced alternative phylogenetic trees of Brachythoraci with new subdivisions.

Systematics
 Basal genus Maideria
 Basal genus Xiangshuiosteus
 Superfamily Buchanosteoidea
 Family Buchanosteidae
 Superfamily Gemuendenaspoidea
 Family Gemuendenaspidae
 Superfamily Homosteoidea
 Family Homostiidae
 Superfamily Brachydeiroidea
 Family Brachydeiridae
 Family Leptosteidae
 Superfamily Coccosteoidea
 Family Pholidosteidae
 Family Coccosteidae
 Family Plourdosteidae
 Family Torosteidae
 Family Incisoscutidae
 Family Camuropiscidae
 Superfamily Dinichthyloidea
 Family Hadrosteidae
 Family Dinichthyidae
 Family Trematosteidae
 Family Rhachiosteidae
 Family Titanichthyidae
 Family Bungartiidae
 Family Selenosteidae
 Family Mylostomatidae

References

Arthrodires
Vertebrate infraorders